Morrison Records is an independent Australian jazz record label that is co-owned and run by James Morrison, his brother John Morrison and friend David Green.  Artists currently on the label include James himself, his brother John's Swing City big band and renowned vocalist Emma Pask.

See also 
 List of record labels

External links 
 Morrison Records Official Website
 James Morrison's Website
 Swing City's Website
 Emma Pask's Website

Australian independent record labels
Jazz record labels